Agliana is a comune (municipality) in the Province of Pistoia in the Italian region of Tuscany, located about  northwest of Florence and about  southeast of Pistoia. Agliana borders the municipalities of Montale, Montemurlo, Pistoia, Prato, and Quarrata.

Notable people
 Giuseppe Morosi, professional footballer

Twin towns
Agliana is twinned with:

  Mallemort, France
  Tifariti, Western Sahara
  Beit Sahour, Palestine

References

External links

 Comune di Agliana (in Italian)

Cities and towns in Tuscany
Articles which contain graphical timelines